Enrique Campos (born 7 January 1961) is a retired road bicycle racer from Venezuela. He represented his native country at two consecutive Summer Olympics, starting in 1984. Campos also won the bronze medal in the Men's Individual Race Race (171 km) at the 1987 Pan American Games. He was nicknamed “El Águila” during his career.

References

1961 births
Living people
Cyclists at the 1984 Summer Olympics
Cyclists at the 1988 Summer Olympics
Cyclists at the 1987 Pan American Games
Olympic cyclists of Venezuela
Venezuelan track cyclists
Venezuelan male cyclists
Place of birth missing (living people)
Pan American Games bronze medalists for Venezuela
Pan American Games medalists in cycling
Medalists at the 1987 Pan American Games
20th-century Venezuelan people
21st-century Venezuelan people